Sarmat may refer to:

 RS-28 Sarmat, a Russian missile
 Sarmat, a historical region of Bulga, Ethiopia
 , a Russian ship from 1904/1905; see Vandal (tanker)
 Sarmato, a comune in Piacenza, Italy
 Pseudonym of Russian writer Kazimir Barantsevich (1851–1927)

See also 
 Sarmatian (disambiguation)
 Samrat (disambiguation)